Remeşin or Rameshin or Remeshin may refer to:
Aşağı Remeşin, Azerbaijan
Yuxarı Remeşin, Azerbaijan